A number of ISO standards cover trailer connectors, the electrical connectors between vehicles and the trailers they tow that provide a means of control for the trailers. These are listed below, with notes on significant deviations from them that can cause problems.

Trailer connectors between the trailer and passenger car, light truck or heavy trucks with 12V systems 
In Europe, both 7-pin (ISO 1724) and 13-pin (ISO 11446) are common. The 13-pin version being phased in is newer, provides more services than the 7-pin, a more positive locking and also better protection against moisture and contamination.

The connectors are designed for 12V systems. Exceptions for the 7-pin connector may exist where they may be used for 6V and 24V.

Vehicles and trailers with 6V systems can use the 7-pin or a 5-pin connector, but these are rare today. Heavy trucks that may have 12V systems are usually older (vintage vehicles) or on non-European markets.

The color coding is defined in ISO 4141-3, but the standard color codes are not always followed and may be different for a particular vehicle.

13-pin trailer connector (ISO 11446) 

Physical design of the standard ISO 11446 but also called Jaeger-connector from the company that developed it.

The following supplementary information exists for the connector:

Other variants of this connector exists but they are rare. One is used in 24V applications while the other is for ADR use. The difference is how they are mechanically keyed. These connectors are not very common.

7-pin trailer connector for ABS/EBS (ISO 7638-2) 

Physical design according to standard ISO 7638-2.

This connector is intended to be used for 12V ABS and EBS on heavy duty trailers.

Identified by key tab on outer ring between pin 3 and 4.

The following supplementary information exists for the connector:

7-pin trailer connector Type 12N (ISO 1724) 

Physical design according to standard ISO 1724.

The 7-pin connector uses on newer trailers all 7 pins according to the ISO standard.

On older trailers there's sometimes a 5-wire setup using a 7-pin connector. In these cases exclude connection for right tail light (58R) and rear fog light (54G) and connect the tail lights only to pin for left tail light (58L).

Joining the pins for right and left tail lights (58R and 58L) can cause problems on German cars where it is possible to activate Standing Lamps on only one side of the vehicle.

Pin 2 (54G) 
According to DIN 72552 pin 54G was initially intended for electrical control of brakes on trailers.

Later pin 2 (54G) has been used for a variety of functions different from the original intent. A few examples:
 +12V permanent.
 +12V via ignition lock.
 Rear fog lights.
 Reversing lights.

This is why in regions using this connector, trailers on the road are occasionally seen with the rear fog lights on when they should be off. (Vehicle wired for +12V, permanent or via ignition and trailer wired for fog lamps)

Special case for Australia 
Australia uses basically the same wiring with the exception for pin 5 and pin 2. The problematic part here is that pin 5 is used for trailer brake which means that if you for some reason connect an Australian trailer to a towing vehicle with ISO wiring you will get into trouble with the trailer brakes being applied as soon as you turn on the lights.

Further reading at Trailer Connector/Australia.

7-pin trailer connector Type 12S (ISO 3732) 

Physical design according to standard ISO 3732.

Signals in this connector (if following the standard) are not generally legally required (local regulations may still apply), which means that it is not mandatory to connect it if it is present.

This connector is basically the same as the 12N (ISO 1724) connector, but the center pin (pin 7) has changed gender to make the plug and outlet unique. Socket is replaced with pin in the plug, pin is replaced with socket in outlet.

The purpose of this connector is to supplement the 12N (ISO 1724) connector for power supply of consumers common in caravans (Travel trailers). This is used in Great Britain but may also be used in other areas of Europe.

There are two main variants of the wiring with a switchover date 1999. The difference is that an additional connection for ground and that battery charging in the trailer is shared with other consumers. This means that if a pre-1999 camper trailer with a battery is connected to a post 1999 vehicle there's a risk that the battery charging won't work.

The combination of 12N+12S was replaced in 2008 by the 13-pin ISO 11446 connector.

The following supplementary information exists for the connector:

5-pin connector (ISO 1724) 
Physical design according to standard ISO 1724.

The 5-pin has a design and pin layout that is identical to the 7-pin ISO 1724 connector with the exception for the lack of pin 1 (L) and pin 4 (R). This connector is sometimes present on vintage vehicles and the actual wiring may be completely different from what the standard states which means that measuring before connecting is a good idea.

Whenever there is a need to change the plug or outlet it can be replaced with a 7-pin.

Trailer connectors between heavy duty trailer and the tractor unit 

These connectors are designated as 24 volt.

15-pin trailer connector (ISO 12098) 

Physical design according to standard ISO 12098.

This connector is present on newer heavy duty commercial trucks and trailers following the ISO standard and is intended to replace the combination of connectors according to standards ISO 1185 and ISO 3731. The 15-pin connector is not designed to replace the ISO 7638 connector.

The following supplementary information exists for the connector:

Notice: There was a predecessor to this connector with 13 pins that on a cursory glance is identical to the 15 pin connector but has a different arrangement of the pins. It was not very common but may exist on some vehicles and can result in an unpleasant surprise.

7-pin trailer connector for ABS/EBS (ISO 7638-1) 

Physical design according to standard ISO 7638-1.

This connector is intended for 24V ABS and EBS on heavy duty trailers.

Identified by key tab on outer ring by pin 5.

The following supplementary information exists for the connector:

7-pin trailer connector 24N (ISO 1185) 

Physical design according to standard ISO 1185.

This connector is common on heavy duty commercial trucks and trailers but is replaced by the ISO 12098 connector on newer vehicles.

The following supplementary information exists for the connector:

The physical design is also used by SAE J560 with basically the same configuration. The difference is that SAE J560 uses 12V (larger wire cross-section and higher amp rating on fuses). Pin 7 may also have a different behavior on SAE J560.

7-pin trailer connector 24S (ISO 3731) 

Physical design according to standard ISO 3731.

This connector is common but on newer vehicles it is replaced by the connectors according to ISO 12098 and ISO 7638.

See also

 Trailer connector
 Trailer connectors in Australia
 Trailer connectors in Europe
 Trailer connectors in North America
 Trailer connectors in military organizations

References

Symbol Guide 

Automotive electrics
Trailers
DC power connectors